The Wilderness; or, Braddock's Times: A Tale of the West is an historical novel by the Irish-American writer James McHenry (1784–1845) first published by Bliss & White in New York in 1823. It was republished in London that same year with the title The Wilderness, or The Youthful Days of Washington. The novel is set in 1750s Pittsburgh, Pennsylvania.

The novel tells the story of an Irish family from Ulster on the frontier of the American West at colonial Pittsburgh. In a subplot, George Washington, who is passing through on his historic mission, falls in love with a pioneer maiden named Maria, who refuses him, and therefore he dedicates himself thereafter to the service of his country.

The Wilderness is the first American novel set entirely in Pittsburgh and Western Pennsylvania.

References

Sullivan, Maureen Ann. "James McHenry (20 December 1785-21 July 1845)." Nineteenth-Century American Fiction Writers, edited by Kent P. Ljungquist, vol. 202, Gale, 1999, pp. 185-190. Dictionary of Literary Biography Vol. 202. Gale Literature: Dictionary of Literary Biography.

1823 American novels
American historical novels
Novels set in Pittsburgh
Novels set in the 1750s